Qullqi Pata (Aymara qullqi silver, pata stone bench, step, "silver step", also spelled Kolke Pata) is a  mountain in the Bolivian Andes. It is located in the La Paz Department, Inquisivi Province, Colquiri Municipality, southeast of Colquiri. Qullqi Pata lies south of Kimsa Llallawa. One of the nearest villages is Qillqata (Kelkata).

References 

Mountains of La Paz Department (Bolivia)